Bhulabhai Desai Road, also well known by the old name Warden Road (and the part at and near the swimming pool as Breach Candy), is a niche up-market residential and semi-commercial locality of South Mumbai.

The area has many famous landmarks beside its long and winding stretch, from the Breach Candy Hospital to the Amarsons and Tata gardens and Lincoln House, former location of the Consulate General of the United States, Mumbai. The elite Breach Candy Club in the neighbourhood features the country's largest India-shaped swimming pool. Just off Bhulabhai Desai Road is the women-only Sophia College.

The 18th century Mahalaxmi Temple, which honors the Hindu goddess of wealth and wisdom, is situated nearby on the edge of sea.  It is one of the most famous temples of Mumbai and attracts millions of devotees and tourists each year.

The area falls under the 'D-Ward' of the BMC and shares the postal code 400 026 under the Cumballa Hill post office. It lies 21 kilometers south of Chhatrapati Shivaji International Airport and just 2 kilometers from the Mumbai Central station. It is well connected by local buses run by BEST.

Geographically, this road curls around the Arabian Sea. Because of its picturesque location, real estate prices here are among the most expensive in the country.

Etymology
The origin of the name Breach Candy, first attested by 1828 at least, is widely given as an Anglicisation of an Arabic-Marathi name Burj-khāḍī ('the tower of the creek'); this is also given in the famous Hobson-Jobson dictionary. However, this interpretation is disputed. In seventeenth- to nineteenth-century English, breach had meanings including 'the breaking of waves on a coast', 'surf made by the sea breaking over rocks; broken water, breakers' and 'a break in a coast, a bay, harbour', and may in the context of Breach Candy even have been used to refer to a breakwater at the location. Thus, although the breach part of the name could be an Anglicisation of a local word, it could simply be an English word in its own right. Meanwhile, Candy may be an Anglicisation of Marathi khind ('mountain pass') or Kannada khindi ('a breach').

History

Not long ago, Breach Candy was sparsely populated with very few bungalows and mansions. Most of the residents were born into old money. Some of these bungalows and mansions still stand. The Breach Candy House, the Breach Candy Swimming Club and the Breach Candy Hospital have been present since the time of British rule.

At the northern foot of the Cumballa Hill, in the part now called Breach Candy, was a temple to three goddesses—Mahakali, Mahalakshmi and Mahasaraswati. A creek to the north separated the island of Bombay from the Koli island of Worli. This creek was filled after the completion of the Hornby Vellard in 1784. Soon after, the modern temple of Mahalakshmi was built here.

What are now the Amarson and Tata gardens were landfills with abandoned construction trucks, cranes and bulldozers probably used in land reclamation projects. A few of these trucks were parked in a truck-sized garage behind Scandal Point. Similarly, trucks, cranes and bulldozers were seen abandoned on the land which is now known as Priyadarshini Park.

Notable residents
Kailash Surendranath, film director
RK Laxman, Cartoonist
Asha Bhosle, Singer
Ronnie Screwvala, producer and CEO and founding chairman of UTV Group
Annapurna Devi, notable Indian classical musician and former wife of Pandit Ravi Shankar
Apeksha Desai, Marathoner
Homi Adajania, Filmmaker 
Kunal Desai, Vigilante
Bhanu Athaiya, Oscar-winning costume designer for Gandhi
Naina Lal Kidwai, businesswoman
Jagjit Singh, classical singer
Aarti Chhabria, actress
Salman Rushdie, author. Born and raised in Breach Candy, he describes the area as it was from Indian independence to the 1960s in Midnight's Children.
 Azim Premji, chairman and CEO of Wipro Technologies
Shibani Bathija, screenwriter
Supriya Sule, politician
Tara Sharma, actress
Partap Sharma, author and playwright
Alyque Padamsee, theatre producer and actor
Ramesh Balsekar, Advaita Vendanta master
Kishore Kumar, Singer
Lata Mangeshkar, Singer

Education
 Green Lawns High School
 Activity High School
 Sophia College
 DSB International School (German school) Garden Campus

Picture links
Gordon Gibbons Photographs of Breach Candy 1937-1940

References 

Neighbourhoods in Mumbai
Streets in Mumbai